Abdel Sattar Tarabulsi (born 1908, date of death unknown) was a Lebanese sports shooter. He competed in the 50 m pistol event at the 1952 Summer Olympics.

References

External links
 

1908 births
Year of death missing
Lebanese male sport shooters
Olympic shooters of Lebanon
Shooters at the 1952 Summer Olympics
Place of birth missing